A. K. M. Mahmood (born 1 September 1975) is a first-class and List A cricketer from Bangladesh. He was born in Sylhet, Chittagong and is sometimes known by his nickname Imon. A specialist wicket keeper, he had little success with the bat when he played for Sylhet Division between 2000 and 2003 but took 37 catches in all forms of the game.

References

Bangladeshi cricketers
Sylhet Division cricketers
Living people
1975 births
Wicket-keepers